Alonso Cano is a station on Line 7 of the Madrid Metro. It is located in fare Zone A.

While this station is situated relatively close to Iglesia station on Line 1, there is no interchange between the two stations.

References 

Line 7 (Madrid Metro) stations
Railway stations in Spain opened in 1998
Buildings and structures in Almagro neighborhood, Madrid